37P/Forbes is a periodic comet in the Solar System. It was discovered on August 1, 1929, by Alexander F. I. Forbes in South Africa.

The comet nucleus is estimated to be 1.9 kilometers in diameter.

References

External links 
 Orbital simulation from JPL (Java) / Horizons Ephemeris
 37P/Forbes – Seiichi Yoshida @ aerith.net
 37P at Kronk's Cometography
 37P/Forbes 2011 05 29, 2:55:09 UT; mag 18.0 N; C. Bell H47

Periodic comets
0037
Comets in 2011
Comets in 2018
19290801